John Lawrence Mauran, FAIA (1866–1933) was an American architect responsible for many downtown landmarks in St. Louis, Missouri. He was also active in Wisconsin and Texas.

Life 
Mauran was born in Providence, Rhode Island and studied at the Massachusetts Institute of Technology from 1885 through 1889, under the French-American educator Eugene Letang. While there, he was a member of the fraternity of Delta Psi  St. Anthony Hall).

Career 
He entered the Boston office of Shepley, Rutan and Coolidge as a young draftsman. There he helped design the 1893 Chicago Public Library (now the Chicago Cultural Center) and the 1894 Art Institute of Chicago.

Sent by the firm to establish a branch office in St. Louis, his employers closed shop there in 1900 and Mauran formed his own partnership, Mauran, Russell & Garden, with Ernest John Russell and Edward Garden. After the departure of Garden in 1909 it was briefly known as Mauran & Russell, but with the addition of William DeForest Crowell it became Mauran, Russell & Crowell in 1911. The firm carved out a niche designing Carnegie libraries in towns in Missouri, Wisconsin, and Kansas.  Mauran had also married a local socialite, Isabel Chapman, in 1899, which aided his social connections, bringing commissions for local churches, office buildings, and a number of sizable mansions in St. Louis's new private places.  He himself lived at #40 Vandeventer Place, on the most prestigious street in the city.

In 1902, Mauran became a Fellow of the American Institute of Architects, and was appointed by Theodore Roosevelt to the first United States Commission of Fine Arts in 1910.  In 1915, he was elected President of the AIA; in 1925, he served as head of the St. Louis Memorial Plaza Commission.  Mauran died unexpectedly after an appendicitis attack in 1933, at the family's summer home in New Hampshire.

Work 
Stylistically versatile through its decades of activity, Mauran's office was more commercially than artistically oriented, with work concentrated in the St. Louis area and a large number of hotel commissions in Texas.  The St. Louis high-rises of the 1900s and 1910s show a clear influence from the Sullivan skyscrapers they stand next to, like the Wainwright Building, without Sullivan's distinctive ornament.

The stripped-classical style of the St. Louis Soldiers' Memorial, in 1939 a late example of its kind, is appropriate for its civic presence.  Like other public buildings in the downtown Civic Plaza, the initial plans were far more elaborate, before delay and budget pressures left the actual results simplified and scaled down.

W.O. Mullgardt joined the firm in 1930.  When Mauran died in 1933, this left William Crowell as its principal designer.  The modernist 1941 Post-Dispatch Printing Plant, with its long ribbons of windows, preceded other International Style buildings in St. Louis by about nine years.  This was the firm's final major work.

Select projects 

 Laclede Power Company plant, St. Louis, Missouri,1901

 First Church of Christ Scientist, St. Louis, Missouri, 1903 (Holy Corners Historic District)
 Racine Public Library, Racine, Wisconsin, 1904
 residences in private places Portland Place and Washington Terrace, St. Louis, Missouri, 1905-1909
 Racquet Club, St. Louis, Missouri, 1906 (Holy Corners Historic District)
 Second Baptist Church, St. Louis, Missouri, 1907 (Holy Corners Historic District)
 Grand Leader Department Store, later Stix Baer & Fuller, Washington and 6th Avenue, St. Louis, Missouri, 1906
 Gunter Hotel, San Antonio, Texas, 1909
 Grand Leader Department Store Model Annex, Washington and 6th Avenue, St. Louis, Missouri, 1911
 Laclede Gas Light Company Building, St. Louis, Missouri, 1911
 Dallas Municipal Building (as associate architects), Dallas, Texas, 1912
 Galvez Hotel, Galveston, Texas, 1912
 Railway Exchange Building, St. Louis, Missouri, 1913
 Empire Theater and Brady Building, San Antonio, 1913
 Rice Hotel, Houston, Texas, 1913.
 St. Louis and San Francisco Railroad Building, Joplin, Missouri, 1913
 Federal Reserve Bank of St Louis, St. Louis, Missouri, 1923
 Union Market, St. Louis, Missouri, 1924
 Southwestern Bell Building, St. Louis, Missouri, 1926
 Police Headquarters and Police Academy, St. Louis, Missouri, 1927-1928
 Missouri Pacific Building, St. Louis, Missouri, 1928
 Blackstone Hotel, Fort Worth, Texas, 1929
 St. Louis Globe-Democrat Building, St. Louis, Missouri, 1931
 Federal Courts Building, St. Louis, Missiouri, 1932-1934
 Soldiers' Memorial, with architectural sculpture by Walker Hancock, St. Louis, Missouri, 1936
 St. Louis Post-Dispatch Printing Plant, St. Louis, Missouri, 1941

References

External links 
 online biography with photograph
 Architecture in Texas, 1895-1945, by Jay C. Henry
 National Historic Register application discussing Mauran's career
 emporis list of commissions

1866 births
1933 deaths
19th-century American architects
Fellows of the American Institute of Architects
Architects from Providence, Rhode Island
St. Louis Globe-Democrat people
20th-century American architects
Architects from St. Louis
Massachusetts Institute of Technology alumni
St. Anthony Hall